Mountain sandwort is a common name for several plants and may refer to:

Arenaria montana, native to southwestern Europe
Minuartia groenlandica syn. Arenaria groenlandica
Minuartia rubella